is a Japanese athlete. She competed in the women's high jump at the 1972 Summer Olympics.

References

1949 births
Living people
Place of birth missing (living people)
Japanese female high jumpers
Olympic female high jumpers
Olympic athletes of Japan
Athletes (track and field) at the 1972 Summer Olympics
Japan Championships in Athletics winners
20th-century Japanese women